A virtual zoo is a new concept that uses the zoo model in a web format.  Many virtual zoos are websites that are created to simulate a visit to a zoo, and the visitors to these sites can view exhibits about animals and their habitats.  Many Zoos as well as schools have developed virtual zoos.  For example, instead of actual animals, a virtual zoo will have articles and media as exhibits.  There are many virtual zoos that have been created; most are small and unremarkable, while some have hundreds of exhibits.

Many of these projects focus on photos of animals or the sale of animal products.  Some virtual zoos are strictly educational.  Zoos on the web are good sources of animal information.

History
The first virtual zoo was created in 1994 by Ken Boschert, DVM. Boschert created his site as a way of informing people about animals and how to care for them.  His site has been recognized by Education World and "Web 100".

In 2017, Hari Kunduru founded Zoptiks, a modern virtual zoo. Where you can find zoologist backed information about animals and dinosaurs as well as explore them via augmented reality. Similarly, Zoptiks is a zoo directory where you can find zoos, aquariums, wildlife sanctuaries and other zoological organizations around the world.

Purpose
The validity of virtual zoos has met with some resistance. However, many view virtual zoos as the way of the future for conservation.  Zoos have faced ethical issues surrounding the capture and keeping of wild animals.  Virtual zoos can provide information and experience without any disturbance to habits or ecosystems.  According to Zoos Victoria, the stated purpose of a zoo is to be centers for wildlife experience, education, conservation and research.  Virtual Zoos can contribute to these stated purposes, such as education and research, with little impact to animal life.

Virtual Zoo during lockdown 
Since the COVID-19 pandemic, families and children were unable to attend zoos due to nationwide lockdowns. For example, Victoria, Australia offered a 24/7 livestream of animals such as otters, lions, zebras, birds, penguins, leopards, giraffes, and koalas.

References

External links
Animal Photos:
 "Lawrence Goes To The Zoo"

Educational Virtual Zoos:

"The Electronic Zoo"
Zoobooks, Virtual Zoo
"The Virtual Zoo"
"The Wild Ones"
"Mr. Crean's Virtual Zoo"

Selling Animal Products:
"The Big Zoo"

Zoos